Phascus occidentalis is a species of leaf beetle of Cameroon and the Democratic Republic of the Congo. It was first described by Julius Weise in 1912.

References

Eumolpinae
Beetles of the Democratic Republic of the Congo
Beetles described in 1912
Taxa named by Julius Weise
Insects of Cameroon